The Queen's School of Kinesiology and Health Studies is a school within the Faculty of Arts and Science of Queen's University at Kingston in Kingston, Ontario, Canada.  It was formerly known as the School of Physical and Health Education.

School of Kinesiology and Health Studies